Sai O is a village of in the Shap Sze Heung area of Sai Kung North, in Tai Po District, Hong Kong.

Administration
Despite its proximity to the neighbouring areas administered by Sha Tin and Sai Kung districts, Sai O is actually administered by Tai Po District. It is covered by the Sai Kung North constituency of the Tai Po District Council, which is currently represented by Ben Tam Yi-pui. Sai O is a recognised village under the New Territories Small House Policy.

See also
 Hong Kong Baptist Theological Seminary
 Nai Chung, another village of Shap Sze Heung, located directly east of Sai O

References

External links

 Delineation of area of existing village Sai O (Sai Kung North) for election of resident representative (2019 to 2022)

Villages in Tai Po District, Hong Kong
Sai Kung North